Free is a 2001 romantic dramedy directed by Andrew Avery, Written by Peter Hansen Gibson and Michael Kingston, starring Corin Nemec, Randall Batinkoff, Carmen Llywelyn and Ione Skye.

Free was produced by Thor Films and distributed by Showtime.

Cast
Boris Eckey as Klaust
Corin Nemec as Mark Jenkins
Randall Batinkoff as Lawrence
Ione Skye as Catherine
Carmen Llywelyn as Laura
J. Kenneth Campbell as James Jenkins
Ellen Crawford as Barbara Jenkins
Dawn Maxey as June
 Tia Riebling as Carmen
Shawnee Free Jones as Marna
Lenore Thomas as Josie
Theo Nicholas Pagones as Gustavo
Clay Wilcox as Bob
Alan Woolf as Daniel Waldoff
Danny Goldman as Dr.
Dax Griffin as Skeet
Peter Hansen Gibson as Gibby
 Michael Kingston as King
Mary Gillis as Marge
Brandon Keener as Bill Stein
Michelle Arthur as Secretary
Alla Korot as Intimidating Girl
Alexander Martin as Jesus
Edoardo Ballerini Uncredited as Paul Farley

External links

2001 albums
2001 romantic comedy films
2001 films
2000s English-language films